Kondampalli is a village in Pullampet mandal, Kadapa district, Andhra Pradesh, India -516107

References
Villages in Kadapa district